World Sunni Movement  is a Sunni Islamic religious organization in Bangladesh. The organization was founded in 1979 in Bangladesh by Syed Imam Hayat. The chief advisor of the organization is the Islamic scholar and researcher of Hadith Syed Mohammad Saifur Rahman Nizami. The secretary-general of the organization is Raihan Rahbar. Besides Bangladesh World Sunni Movement organize their activities in The United States, The United Kingdom, France, Italy, Portugal, Spain, Greece, Sweden, UAE, Kuwait, Lebanon, South Africa, Malaysia, Singapore, etc. countries in the globe.

Beliefs 
World Sunni Movement is based on the principles of Sunni Islam particularly Ahle Sunnat or Barelvi movement contrary to Wahabi-Deobandi ideologies. Their faith is there is no direct light, knowledge, blessing, forgiveness from God without their dearest Prophet Mohammad. According to Quran Islam is a complete code of life. So, they believe Islam is not only spiritual but also political and their political philosophy is Khilafat-e-Insaniyat and in their language, it is the representative authority of life & humanity beyond any discrimination, the flow of truth & wealth, the structure of right & freedom, state and world of peace-safety & universal humanity under the light of divine values; given by Prophet Mohammad, the source of all blessing-love-humanity. They celebrate Eid-e-Azam which means Greatest Joy in Hijri year 12th day of Rabi al-Awwal as the holy welcome celebration of the messenger of God which is the greatest blessing from God and the source of all blessings for them. They celebrate Eid-e-Merajunnabi which means joy for the meeting of the Islamic prophet Mohammad with God in Hijri year 26th Rajab because they believe the meeting of the prophet is the practical proof of the existence of God through the prophet. They also celebrate Martyr Day in Hijri year 10th al-Muharram. On this day prophet's beloved Husayn ibn Ali was killed by the army of Umayyad ruler Yazid I.

Role of woman
Both men and women participate in all the programs of the organization. Women participate and lead in seminar, meeting, rally, human chain, etc. along with men. They believe the human entity is beyond gender and Islam gives the identity of Muslims beyond gender. According to Quran Islam is a complete code of life. So, they believe excluding women or men there is no completeness. The organization is the opposite of the woman's extreme veil where women are kept at home and can't go outside for education, job by name of Islam. In Islam, seeking knowledge is an obligation for every Muslim. When Hefazat-e-Islam Bangladesh chief Shah Ahmad Shafi has advised the parents not to send their daughters to educational institutions and not to educate above class four or five then World Sunni Movement organized several peaceful human chains against the speech of Shah Ahmad Shafi.

Activities

Eid-e-Azam 

They celebrate Eid-e-Azam which means Greatest Joy in Hijri year, the 12th day of Rabi al-Awwal. In Syed Imam Hayat's language, “Great holy welcome of beloved Rasul to us is coming of life to our dead soul, coming of light to our dark life, coming of love-kindness-wisdom-humanity-freedom-liberty & peace against falsehood-oppression-cruelty-terrorism-injustice & destruction.”

Eid-e-Merajunnabi 

According to Islam Hijri year, 26th Rajab Islamic prophet Mohammad directly and physically met with God heavenly which is called miraj or ascension to heaven. World Sunni Movement celebrates Eid-e-Merajunnabi on this day as they believe it is God's great favor of direct meeting, & eye witnessing Him by His messenger on behalf of whole mankind which is unimaginable & beyond everyone's knowledge and it is an infinite blessing for all of mankind to know the truth & destination of life.

Martyr Day 

10th al-Muharram of Hijri year the organization celebrates The National Martyr Day of whole Muslims Muslim nation as Islamic Prophet's beloved Husayn ibn Ali was killed by the army of Umayyad Caliphate Umayyad ruler Yazid I who was nominated as successor by his father Muawiyah I before his death. The appointment of Yazid I as a successor by his father was against the Islamic rule, and Husayn ibn Ali refused to pledge allegiance to Yazid I. Husayn ibn Ali is an important person in Islam as he was a member of the Household of Prophet Mohammad (Ahl al-Bayt).

Dark Day 
World Sunni Movement celebrates Dark Day on 23 September. On September 23, 1932, Ibn Saud established the Kingdom of Saudi Arabia. The royal House of Saud demolished most of the old the Islamic heritage such as mosques, Jannat al-Baqi, Jannat al-Mu'alla, the tomb of companions of the Prophet, etc.

They condemn and protest against all the terrorist attacks by the name of religion. They condemned and protested against the terrorist attacks in 2017 London bridge attack, November 2015 Paris attacks, 2019 Sri Lanka Easter bombings, etc. They also protest when someone insults and blows in their religious sentiment.

See also 
Syed Mohammad Saifur Rahman
Isra and Mi'raj
Battle of Karbala
Al-Baqi

References 

Sunni Islamist groups
Islamic organisations based in Bangladesh
Islamic organizations established in the 1970s